The 2021–22 season was Fenerbahçe's 108th season in the existence of the club. The team played in the Basketball Super League and in the EuroLeague.

Players

Squad information

Depth chart

Transactions

In

|}

Out

|}

Out on loan

|}

Pre-season and friendlies

Friendly match

Competitions

Overview

Basketball Super League

League table

Results summary

Results by round

Matches
Note: All times are TRT (UTC+3) as listed by the Turkish Basketball Federation.

Playoffs

Quarterfinals

Semifinals

Finals

EuroLeague

League table

Results summary

Results by round

Matches
Note: All times are CET (UTC+1) as listed by EuroLeague.

Turkish Basketball Cup

Quarterfinals

Semifinals

Final

Statistics

Basketbol Süper Ligi

EuroLeague

References

Fenerbahçe men's basketball seasons
Fenerbahçe
Fenerbahçe